The 1979–80 2. Bundesliga season was the sixth season of the 2. Bundesliga, the second tier of the German football league system. It was played in two regional divisions, Nord and Süd.

Arminia Bielefeld, 1. FC Nürnberg and Karlsruher SC were promoted to the Bundesliga while DSC Wanne-Eickel, OSC Bremerhaven, Arminia Hannover, Wuppertaler SV, MTV 1881 Ingolstadt, Röchling Völklingen and FV Würzburg 04 were relegated to the Oberligas.

Nord 
The 1979–80 season saw OSC Bremerhaven, OSV Hannover, Rot-Weiß Oberhausen and SC Herford promoted to the 2. Bundesliga from the Oberligas while Arminia Bielefeld had been relegated to the 2. Bundesliga Nord from the Bundesliga.

League table

Results

Top scorers 
The league's top scorers:

Süd
The 1979–80 season saw ESV Ingolstadt, SV Röchling Völklingen, SSV Ulm 1846 and VfR Oli Bürstadt promoted to the 2. Bundesliga from the Oberligas and SV Darmstadt 98 and 1. FC Nürnberg relegated to the 2. Bundesliga Süd from the Bundesliga.

League table

Results

Top scorers 
The league's top scorers:

Promotion play-offs
The final place in the Bundesliga was contested between the two runners-up in the Nord and Süd divisions. Karlsruher SC won on aggregate and were promoted to the Bundesliga.

References

External links
 2. Bundesliga 1979/1980 Nord at Weltfussball.de 
 2. Bundesliga 1979/1980 Süd at Weltfussball.de 
 1979–80 2. Bundesliga at kicker.de 

1979-80
2
German